is a public pasture farm situated in Mount Rokkō, Kobe, Japan.

History
The construction of a pasture farm on Mount Rokkō was already considered in as early as 1975, when surveys on the pros and cons of building such a pasture were taken.

Nature
Known for its "beautiful natural settings", a handful of animal species can be found roaming about in Rokkosan Pasture. This includes cows, goats, horses, and sheep.

Facilities and geography

There are a few restaurants at the pasture. Horse riding opportunities are available at the pasture. In addition, visitors can have the chance to make their own select food items, including ice cream, as well as feed some of the animals on the farm ground. The Kobe cheese-making process is available for public view. The pasture is a half hour drive from Kobe below Mount Rokkō, and is linked to the mountain's ranch. Rokkosan Pasture can also be reached by cable car.

Climate
The temperature at Rokkosan Pasture is at its highest in August, and at its lowest in both January and February.

References

External links

 

Kobe